, better known by her stage name , is a Japanese actress represented by the talent agency Horipro.

Biography
After dropping out of the Joshibi University of Art and Design Junior College, Suzuki became a research student at Bungakuza.

In 1994, after her institute graduation, she starred in her debut film, Ai no Shinsekai, alongside Reiko Kataoka. The film's director, Kinema Junpo, won the 37th Blue Ribbon Rookie Award and the Sponichi Newcomer Award in the Grand Prix of the Mainichi Film Award.

Suzuki married the actor Sumihiro Yoshikawa on October 5, 2011, but they divorced in August 2015.

In 2012, she released her first essay, Joyū Geki-ba, from Wanibooks.

Filmography

TV series
NHK

Nippon TV

Tokyo Broadcasting System

Fuji Television

TV Asahi

TV Tokyo

WOWOW

LaLa TV

Films

References

External links
 Official profile 
 

Japanese actresses
1972 births
Living people
Actors from Shizuoka Prefecture